"Never Hold You Down" is the fourth single released from Australian singer, Guy Sebastian's fifth studio album, Like It Like That. The single was released digitally on 4 June 2010. The video for the single was released on Friday 28 May 2010 and premiered on ABC's Rage music program the next day

Track listing

Release history

References

2010 singles
Guy Sebastian songs
2009 songs
Songs written by Guy Sebastian
Sony Music Australia singles
Songs written by David Ryan Harris